Demajagua or La Demajagua may refer to:

Places
Demajagua, a barrio in the municipality of Fajardo, Puerto Rico
La Demajagua, Isle of Youth, a village in the Isle of Youth, Cuba
La Demajagua (memorial), a historical memorial related to the Ten Years' War near Manzanillo, Cuba

Other
La Demajagua (newspaper), a Cuban newspaper